The Espresso Book Machine (EBM) is a print on demand (POD) machine created by On Demand Books.  It prints, collates, covers, and binds a single book in a few minutes.

Introduced in 2007, EBM is small enough to fit in a retail bookstore or small library room, and as such it is targeted at retail and library markets. The EBM can potentially allow readers to obtain any book title, even books that are out of print. The machine takes a PDF file for input and prints, binds, and trims the reader’s selection as a paperback book.

History
Jason Epstein gave a series of lectures in 1999 about his experiences in publishing. Epstein mentioned in his speech that a future was possible in which customers would be able to print an out-of-stock title on the spot, if a book-printing machine could be made that would fit in a store. He founded 3BillionBooks with Michael Smolens, an entrepreneur from Long Island living in Russia, and Thor Sigvaldason, a consultant at Price Waterhouse Coopers. At the time, Jeff Marsh, a St. Louis engineer and inventor, had already constructed a prototype book printer that could both photocopy and bind. Marsh was working on this project for Harvey Ross, who held U.S. Patent 5,465,213. Peter Zelchenko, a Chicago-based technologist and a partner of Ross in a related patent effort, worked with Marsh to prove the concept and also helped bring Marsh and other players together with several venture interests. 

Ultimately Epstein, together with Dane Neller, former President and CEO of Dean and Deluca, licensed Marsh's invention and founded On Demand Books. 

The first Espresso Book Machine was installed and demonstrated June 21, 2007, at the New York Public Library's Science, Industry and Business Library. For a month, the public was allowed to test the machine by printing free copies of public domain titles provided by the Open Content Alliance (OCA), a non-profit organization with a database of over 200,000 titles.

Distribution
The direct-to-consumer model supported by Espresso Book Machine eliminates the need for shipping, warehousing, returns, and pulping of unsold books; it allows simultaneous global availability of millions of new and backlist titles.

EBM books can also be made available for distribution through Lightning Source, a subsidiary of Ingram Content Group.

References

External links

Printing devices
Bookselling
Book publishing
2007 introductions